Yunxi District is one of three urban districts in Yueyang City, Hunan province, China; it is also the 4th smallest district by population (after Wulingyuan. Nanyue and Beita Districts) in the province. The district is located in the east of the city proper of Yueyang. Yunxi District is located on the southeastern shore of Yangtze River, the Lake of Dongting flows into the Yangtze in the south western outer margin of the district. It is bordered by Jianli County of Hubei across the Yangtze to the west and the northwest, by Linxiang City to the east, by Yueyanglou District and Yueyang County to the south. The district has a subdistrict and three towns under its jurisdiction. the gover

Administrative divisions
After an adjustment of township-level administrative divisions of Yunxi District on 30 November 2015, Yunxi has three towns and one subdistrict under its jurisdiction, they are:

2 towns
 Lucheng, Yueyang
 Lukou, Yueyang

2 subdistricts
 Changling, Yueyang
 Yunxi Subdistrict

References

www.xzqh.org 

 
County-level divisions of Hunan
Yueyang